Quantum Key is a 2015 mini-album by Tangerine Dream. It is roughly the group's 145th release. It is a precursor and companion album to the 2017 major studio album Quantum Gate.

Track listing
All tracks composed by Edgar Froese, Thorsten Quaeschning and Ulrich Schnauss except where noted 
 "Genesis of Precious Thoughts"  – 9:13
 "Electron Bonfire"  – 5:05
 "Drowning in Universes"  – 11:07
 "Mirage of Reality"  – 6:44 (Quaeschning, Schnauss)

Personnel
Tangerine Dream
Edgar Froesesynthesizers, guitar	
Thorsten QuaeschningMusical director, synthesizers, guitar, steel drums, bass guitar
Ulrich Schnausssynthesizers, sequencer
Hoshiko Yamaneviolin
Credits
Bianca Froese-Acquayeproducer
Birgir Jón Birgissonmastering
Katja Zerullprinting supervisor
Ian Laidlawband photography

References

External links

2015 albums
Tangerine Dream albums